The following is a list of squads for all twelve national teams that competed at the 2019 UEFA European Under-21 Championship. Each national team had to submit a final squad of 23 players, three of whom had to be goalkeepers.

Players in boldface were capped at full international level prior to the start of the tournament.

Age, caps, goals and club as of 16 June 2019.

Group A

Italy
Head coach: Luigi Di Biagio

The 23-man squad was released on 6 June 2019. Andrea Pinamonti had an injury and thus Federico Bonazzoli was called in his place.

 (on loan from Novara)

 (on loan from Udinese)

 (on loan from Inter Milan)
 (on loan from Inter Milan)

 (on loan from Milan)
 (on loan from Lazio)

 (on loan from Sampdoria)

Spain
Head coach: Luis de la Fuente

The 25-man provisional squad was released on 17 May 2019. Brahim Díaz had an injury and thus Marc Cucurella was called in his place. The final list was published on 5 June 2019. Pedro Porro had an injury and thus Pol Lirola was called in his place.

 (on loan from Valencia)
 (on loan from Wolverhampton Wanderers)

Poland
Head coach: Czesław Michniewicz

The final list was published on 5 June 2019.

 (on loan from Liverpool)

 (on loan from Cracovia)

 (on loan from Udinese)
 (on loan from Arsenal)

 (on loan from Fiorentina)

 (on loan from Genoa)

 (on loan from Sampdoria)

Belgium
Head coach: Johan Walem

The squad was released on 4 June 2019.

 (on loan from VfB Stuttgart)

 (on loan from Watford)

Group B

Germany
Head coach: Stefan Kuntz

The 23-man final squad was released on 7 June 2019.

 (on loan from Manchester City)

Denmark
Head coach: Niels Frederiksen

The final list was published on 5 June 2019.

 (on loan from Leicester City)

 (on loan from Fiorentina)

 (on loan from Red Bull Salzburg)

Serbia
Head coach: Goran Đorović

The 23-man final squad was released on 1 June 2019.

 (on loan from Atalanta)

 (on loan from Red Star Belgrade)

 (on loan from Club Brugge)

 (on loan from Valencia)
 (on loan from Chelsea)

 (on loan from Olympiacos)

Austria
Head coach: Werner Gregoritsch

The final list was published on 5 June 2019.

 (on loan from Bayern Munich)

 (on loan from Red Bull Salzburg)

 (on loan from Dynamo Dresden)

Group C

England
Head coach: Aidy Boothroyd

The final squad was named on 27 May 2019.

 (on loan from Manchester United)

 (on loan from Chelsea)
 (on loan from Chelsea)
 (on loan from Chelsea)

 (on loan from Everton)

 (on loan from Chelsea)

 (on loan from Arsenal)
 (on loan from Chelsea)

France
Head coach: Sylvain Ripoll

The final squad, along with twelve reserve players, was announced on 22 May 2019. Martin Terrier had an injury and was thus replaced by Marcus Thuram.

Romania
Head coach: Mirel Radoi

The following players were named to the squad on 28 May 2019 by coach Mirel Radoi, at an official press conference. Denis Drăguș had an injury and Ricardo Grigore was thus called in his place.

 (on loan from Inter Milan)
 (on loan from Viitorul Constanța)

 (on loan from Apollon)

 (on loan from Brighton)

Croatia
Head coach: Nenad Gračan

The final list was published on 5 June 2019.

 (on loan from Dinamo Zagreb)

 (on loan from Leicester City)

 
 (on loan from Milan)

References

Squads
UEFA European Under-21 Championship squads